Proficiency may refer to:
 Language proficiency, the ability of an individual to speak or perform in an acquired language
 Expertise
 Skill, the learned capacity to carry out pre-determined results often with the minimum outlay of time, energy, or both
 Uncertainty coefficient, an information-theoretic measure of nominal association

See also
 
 
 Efficiency (disambiguation)
 Progress (disambiguation)
 Profit (disambiguation)
 Test (disambiguation)